The Seymour Range is a low and small mountain range comprising the mountains/hills between the valley of Cowichan Lake and that of the San Juan River on southern Vancouver Island, British Columbia, Canada. It has an area of 888 km2 and is a subrange of the Vancouver Island Ranges which in turn form part of the Insular Mountains.

See also
Mountain ranges of British Columbia
San Juan River

References

Vancouver Island Ranges
Mountain ranges of British Columbia